FitzWimarc School  is a secondary school in Rayleigh, United Kingdom, named after the Norman land-holder Robert FitzWimarc.

History
1927 Opened as Rayleigh Council Senior School at first location on Love Lane.
30 August 1937 Moved to Hockley Road.
19 November 1937 Opening ceremony performed by John W. Burrows J.P., Chairman of the Southend Higher Education Committee.
10 April 1945 Re-opened as a secondary modern school with a new name ‘Rayleigh Secondary Modern School’ and an extended catchment of 11- to 15-year-olds.
1948 Renamed Rayleigh Secondary Modern and Technical School.
1964 Home Economics block built.
1967 Re-opened as a comprehensive school and renamed Fitzwimarc Comprehensive School.
1 March 2015 Converted to an academy.

School performance

As of 2020, the school's most recent Ofsted inspection was in 2019, with a judgement of Requires Improvement.

References

External links

Secondary schools in Essex
Rayleigh, Essex
1927 establishments in England
Educational institutions established in 1927
Academies in Essex